This page summarises the Australia national soccer team fixtures and results in 2002.

Summary
Australia's only games in 2002 was when competing in the 2002 OFC Nations Cup in New Zealand. Other than Scott Chipperfield, Australia sent a squad made up of NSL based players. They won their group matches against Vanuatu, New Caledonia and Fiji without conceding a goal. In the semi-final Tahiti scored in the 38th minute and it wasn't until the 88th minute that Mehmet Duraković scored Australia's equaliser to take the game to extra-time. In the 96th minute Damian Mori scored the golden-goal winner for Australia to send them through to the final against the hosts New Zealand. New Zealand won the final 1-0 to secure their third OFC Nations Cup title and qualification to the 2003 FIFA Confederations Cup as representatives of Oceania.

Record

Match results

Oceania Nations Cup

Goal scorers

References

2002
2002 in Australian soccer
2002 national football team results